Merawi is a district of Northern state, Sudan.

References

Districts of Sudan